Peter Kakaščík (born 4 December 1963 in Prešov) is a Slovak former handball player who competed in the 1992 Summer Olympics.

References

1963 births
Living people
Slovak male handball players
Olympic handball players of Czechoslovakia
Czechoslovak male handball players
Handball players at the 1992 Summer Olympics
Sportspeople from Prešov